Recognition in sociology is the public acknowledgment of a person's status or merits (achievements, virtues, service, etc.).

In psychology, excessively seeking for recognition is regarded as one of the defining traits of a  narcissistic personality disorder.

Another example of recognition is when some person is accorded some special status, such as title or classification.  

According to Charles Taylor, recognition of one's identity is both a fundamental need and a right, and non- or misrecognition is a form of oppression.

In the workplace, recognition has been suggested to increase employee engagement, continuous improvement behaviour, trust in the organization, intention to stay, and satisfaction with management. Others, like Alfie Kohn in Punished by Rewards, point out the dangers of using praise to show recognition, since it may induce compliance in the short-term, but negatively impact quality in the workplace long-term.

Recognition justice

See also

 Respect
 Posthumous recognition
 Name recognition
 Donor recognition wall
 Glory (honor)
 Axel Honneth
 Michel Seymour

References

Evaluation
Sociological terminology